Rowland K. Adams (July 10, 1889 – July 30, 1944) was a justice of the Maryland Court of Appeals, the highest court in the state of Maryland, from 1943 to 1944.

Born in Waynesboro, Pennsylvania, Adams moved with his family to Boonsboro, Maryland in 1895, where he attended Hagerstown High School. Adams graduated from St. John's College in Annapolis in 1911, and from the University of Maryland School of Law in 1914.

Adams served stateside as a captain of infantry in the First World War, and was later a deputy state's attorney and a member of the Baltimore city supreme bench. During World War II, on March 26, 1942, Adams was appointed director of the Third Civilian Defense Region. On January 27, 1943, Governor Herbert O'Conor appointed Adams to a vacancy on the Maryland Court of Appeals caused by the death of Chief Judge Carroll T. Bond, and subsequent elevation of Judge D. Lindley Sloan to the position of Chief Judge.

References

Judges of the Maryland Court of Appeals
1889 births
1944 deaths
People from Waynesboro, Pennsylvania
St. John's College (Annapolis/Santa Fe) alumni
University of Maryland Francis King Carey School of Law alumni
United States Army personnel of World War I
20th-century American judges
United States Army officers
Military personnel from Pennsylvania